The Zhao family refers to dignitaries in China, such as the top bureaucrat, the rich, leaders in-system and their offspring. The phrase originates from Lu Xun's "The True Story of Ah Q". In December 2015, an article in WeChat public account described dignitaries as the Zhao family. Immediately, the phrase "the Zhao family" became an Internet meme. Soon after, the Publicity Department of the Chinese Communist Party prohibited the use of such words as "the Zhao family". Medias which have used such words got punished. Accordingly, such words as "the Zhao family" are no longer visible from main websites in China.

Sources

The phrase "the Zhao family" has its origins in Lu Xun's "The True Story of Ah Q," published in 1921. In the story, old Grandpa Zhao spits out, when Ah Q (who shares the same surname) dares to cheer along with the Zhaos: "You think you're worthy of the surname Zhao?" ( Nǐ yě pèi xìng Zhào?)

On December 19, 2015, a public account in WeChat published an article titled "The argument between Vanke and Baoneng: Barbarians in the front, and the Zhao family in the shadow" which divided the hierarchical China capital market into four ranks: retail investor, banker, plutocrat and the "Zhao family." The Zhao family is in the highest rank which refer to dignitaries. The barbarians refer to people who are rich but powerless. This article made the word "Zhao family" attract extensive attention.

Derived usages

As the word spreading widely, there have come up derived usages such as "the Zhao family empire", "the Zhao king". Here are some examples:

While having words with 50 Cent Party, some people used "You think you're worthy of the surname Zhao?" as a taunt and response.

Commentaries
 Qiao Mu, associate professor in Beijing Foreign Studies University, said that "the word 'the Zhao family' is a subversive deconstruction in Internet era. We called officials 'People's public servant' whereas in fact they are still dignitaries. There are just princelings in China. It's sensitive to say so frankly, thus people use words like 'the Zhao family' as a taunt."
 Hong Kong Oriental Daily News noted the word expresses both resistance of fake patriotism propagandize and dissatisfied with the fact.
 Hu Ping, the honorary editor of Chinese magazine Beijing Spring, believed that princelings, represented by General Secretary of the Chinese Communist Party Xi Jinping, were now gathering politics and economy resources without restriction, which obviously contradicted with the claim of right in civilians.

References

See also
 Crony capitalism
 Princelings

Chinese Internet slang
Internet censorship in China
Politics of China
WeChat